The 2006 V8 Supercar Championship Series was an Australian based motor racing competition for V8 Supercars. It began on 25 March 2006 in Adelaide and ended on 10 December 2006 at Phillip Island after 13 rounds. The 2006 Championship was the eighth V8 Supercar Championship Series.

The Drivers Championship was won by Rick Kelly, the Teams Championship by the Toll HSV Dealer Team and the Manufacturers Championship by Ford. As the winner of the Drivers Championship, Kelly was also awarded the 47th Australian Touring Car Championship title by the Confederation of Australian Motor Sport.

Race calendar
The 2006 V8 Supercar Championship Series was contested over 13 rounds. The Betta Electrical 500 and the Supercheap Auto Bathurst 1000 were endurance events which were contested over a single race with two drivers per car. The round at Winton Motor Raceway was organised as a late replacement for the cancelled V8 Supercars China Round.

Teams and drivers
The following teams and drivers competed in the 2006 V8 Supercar Championship Series. 

* = Drove in Sandown 500 only

** = Drove in Bathurst 1000 only

 – Leased Team Kiwi entry at final round after Team Kiwi's only Commodore was destroyed at Bathurst.
 – Leased Britek entry at Pukekohe round.

Points system
Championship points were awarded on the following basis:

First 3-race format, normal race: Used for races 1 and 3 for Pukekohe through Oran Park.
First 3-race format, reverse grid: Used for race 2 for Pukekohe through Oran Park.
Second 3-race format: Used for all races from the Surfers Paradise round onward.
2-race format: Used for the Clipsal 500 Adelaide.
Endurance format: Used for the Sandown 500 and Bathurst 1000.

Drivers were required to drop the points from their worst round up to and including Bathurst.

Results and standings

Drivers Championship

Team Championship

(S) denotes a single car team.

Manufacturers Championship
Ford won the Manufacturers Championship, having gained the most round victories over the course of the championship.
.

References

External links
 Official V8 Supercar site
 2006 Racing Results Archive 
 Drivers Championship points table
 Teams Championship points table

Supercars Championship seasons
V8 Supercar Championship Series